wolfSSH is a small, portable, embedded SSH library targeted for use by embedded systems developers. It is an open-source implementation of SSH written in the C language. It includes SSH client libraries and an SSH server implementation. It allows for password and public key authentication.

Platforms

wolfSSH is currently available for Win32/64, Linux, macOS, Solaris, Threadx, VxWorks, FreeBSD, NetBSD, OpenBSD, embedded Linux, WinCE, Haiku, OpenWrt, iPhone (iOS), Android, Nintendo Wii and Gamecube through DevKitPro support, QNX, MontaVista, TRON variants (TRON/ITRON/µITRON), NonStop OS, OpenCL, Micrium's MicroC/OS-II, FreeRTOS, SafeRTOS, Freescale MQX, Nucleus, TinyOS, TI-RTOS, HP-UX, uTasker, embOS, PIC32, PikeOS, and Green Hills INTEGRITY.

Protocols

The wolfSSH SSH library implements the SSHv2 protocol for both client and server. It also includes support for the Secure copy and SSH File Transfer protocols.

Algorithms

wolfSSH uses the cryptographic services provided by wolfCrypt. wolfCrypt Provides RSA, ECC, Diffie–Hellman, AES (CBC, GCM), Random Number Generation, Large Integer support, and base 16/64 encoding/decoding.

Key exchange
diffie-hellman-group1-sha1
diffie-hellman-group14-sha1
diffie-hellman-group-exchange-sha256
ecdh-sha2-nistp256
ecdh-sha2-nistp384
ecdh-sha2-nistp521

Public key
ssh-rsa
ecdsa-sha2-nistp256
ecdsa-sha2-nistp384
ecdsa-sha2-nistp521

Integrity
hmac-sha1
hmac-sha1-96
hmac-sha2-256

Encryption
aes128-cbc
aes128-gcm (OpenSSH compatible)

Licensing
wolfSSH is open source and dual licensed under both the GNU GPL-3.0-or-later and commercial licensing.

See also

Secure Shell
OpenSSH
DropBear
Comparison of SSH clients
Comparison of SSH servers
Comparison of cryptography libraries

References

External links
 wolfSSH Homepage

C (programming language) libraries
Cryptographic software
Secure Shell